The following is the list of incumbent mayors of Metro Cebu. Metro Cebu is the main urban center of the province of Cebu in the Philippines, comprising seven cities and six municipalities.

The mayors of Metro Cebu are considered as the local chief executives of their respective localities and are also members of the Metropolitan Cebu Development and Coordinating Board (MCDCB) patterned to Metropolitan Manila Development Authority (MMDA) but doesn't have legal and institutional powers and resources.

List of mayors

References 

Cebu
Politicians from Cebu